Set It Off is the second single from New Zealand R&B artist J. Williams. It was released on 27 October 2008. It debuted and peaked on the RIANZ charts at number 36 on 22 December 2008.

References

2008 singles
J. Williams (singer) songs
2008 songs
Songs written by J. Williams (singer)
Songs written by Inoke Finau